Keith Bostic may refer to:

 Keith Bostic (American football) (born 1961), American football player
 Keith Bostic (software engineer) (born 1959), American software engineer